Sergei Sergeyevich Frolov (born 20 January 1989) is a former Russian professional football player.

Club career
He played two seasons in the Russian Football National League for FC Nosta Novotroitsk.

References

External links
 
 

1989 births
Living people
Russian footballers
Association football forwards
FC Lokomotiv Moscow players
FC Nosta Novotroitsk players